Kuryakovo is a rural locality (a village) in Lyubomirovskoye Rural Settlement, Sheksninsky District, Vologda Oblast, Russia. The population was 14 as of 2002.

Geography 
Kuryakovo is located 35 km southeast of Sheksna (the district's administrative centre) by road. Sukholomovo is the nearest rural locality.

References 

Rural localities in Sheksninsky District